Christ the King Church is a Roman Catholic church in Trumbull, Connecticut, part of the  Diocese of Bridgeport.

The church was built in 1965-69 and is probably the work of architect J. Gerald Phelan.

References

External links 
 Christ the King - Website
 Diocese of Bridgeport

Roman Catholic churches completed in 1969
Roman Catholic churches in Trumbull, Connecticut
Roman Catholic Diocese of Bridgeport
Churches in Fairfield County, Connecticut
20th-century Roman Catholic church buildings in the United States